Etudes is an album by bassist Ron Carter Quintet which was recorded at Van Gelder Studio and released on the Elektra/Musician label in 1983.

Reception

The AllMusic review by Ron Wynn stated "Sophisticated, elegant quartet date from 1982, with Art Farmer's serene trumpet and flugelhorn playing setting the tone, backed by tenor and soprano saxophonist Bill Evans, who's more restrained than usual. Carter's bass and Tony Williams' drums are both understated and definitive in their support and backing rhythms".
Three of these musicians had major associations with Miles Davis: Carter and Williams from the "great quintet" of the 1960s and Evans from the then-contemporary Davis band.

Track listing
All compositions by Ron Carter except where noted.
 "Last Resort" – 7:29
 "Bottoms Up" – 6:18
 "Arboretum" (Tony Williams) – 4:31
 "Rufus" – 5:12
 "Echoes" – 4:10
 "Doctor's Row" (Williams) – 8:11

Personnel
Ron Carter – bass
Art Farmer – trumpet, flugelhorn
Bill Evans – tenor saxophone, soprano saxophone
Tony Williams – drums

References

Elektra/Musician albums
Ron Carter albums
1983 albums
Albums recorded at Van Gelder Studio